Alan Morrison is an American organist, notable both for his performance career and his teaching. He is the head of the organ department at the Curtis Institute of Music, College Organist at Ursinus College, and Organist in Residence at Spivey Hall at Clayton State University in Morrow, Georgia.

At the start of his performance career he captured First Prize in two of the most prestigious national organ competitions, the Arthur Poister National Organ Playing Competition and the Clarence Mader National Organ Playing Competition, both in 1991 while still a student. After capturing the Silver Medal in the 1994 Calgary International Organ Festival & Competition his concert career was solidified with major engagements and eventual artist management with Karen McFarlane Artists, Inc. He has since played in most major venues throughout the United States, Canada, Europe, Russia and South America.

He has adjudicated numerous competitions including the 50th St. Albans Competition (UK), serving as the only American judge and recitalist. He has also appeared on two episodes of Mister Rogers' Neighborhood which aired in 1994. He is a champion of new music and specifically of American composers and regularly premiers their works. A graduate of both Curtis (BMus in Organ and MMus in Piano Accompanying) and Juilliard (Professional Studies in Organ), his teachers include Sarah Martin, John Weaver, Cherry Rhodes (organ), and Robert Harvey, Vladimir Sokoloff, and Susan Starr (piano).

Recordings 
 Celebration (25th Anniversary of Spivey Hall's Ruffatti organ)
 Paulus Organ Concerto #1 w/ Chamber Orchestra of Philadelphia
 OPUS 76 (Verizon Hall/Kimmel Center
 Cathedral Basilica of the Sacred Heart
 Alan Morrison at St. Luke's, Dunwoody, Georgia
 Organ Power
 St. Philip's Cathedral
 Live from Spivey Hall
 Festive Duo
 Alan Morrison at Church of the Epiphany, Miami
 American Voyage

References

External links
 Publicity page
 www.alanmorrison.com

American classical organists
American male organists
Year of birth missing (living people)
Living people
Curtis Institute of Music alumni
21st-century organists
21st-century American male musicians
21st-century American keyboardists
Ursinus College faculty
Clayton State University people
Male classical organists